Romain Buffet (born 4 February 1985 in Rouen, France) is a French judoka. He competed at the 2012 Summer Olympics in the -90 kg event.

References

External links
 
 

1985 births
Living people
French male judoka
Olympic judoka of France
Judoka at the 2012 Summer Olympics
Sportspeople from Rouen
Universiade medalists in judo
Universiade bronze medalists for France
Medalists at the 2009 Summer Universiade
21st-century French people